Caenorhabditis plicata is a species of nematodes in the genus Caenorhabditis. It was described on carrion in Germany and is phoretic on carrion visiting beetles.

Its genome was sequenced by the University of Edinburgh.

C. plicata groups with C. sp. 1 (Caenorhabditis monodelphis) outside either the 'Drosophilae' or the 'Elegans' supergroups in phylogenetic studies.

References

External links 
 
 Caenorhabditis plicata at fauna-eu.org

plicara
Fauna of Germany
Nematodes described in 1950